Levan Kutalia (born 19 July 1989) is a Georgian professional footballer who plays as a forward for Sektzia Ness Ziona.

Career
On 27 July 2020, Kutalia signed in Hapoel Tel Aviv from the Israeli Premier League.

References

External links
 

1989 births
Living people
People from Zugdidi
Association football forwards
Footballers from Georgia (country)
FC Zugdidi players
FK Slavija Sarajevo players
HŠK Zrinjski Mostar players
FC Zestafoni players
FC Shukura Kobuleti players
FC Merani Martvili players
FC Torpedo Kutaisi players
FC Dinamo Tbilisi players
FC Irtysh Pavlodar players
Hapoel Tel Aviv F.C. players
Hapoel Umm al-Fahm F.C. players
Sektzia Ness Ziona F.C. players
Erovnuli Liga players
Premier League of Bosnia and Herzegovina players
Kazakhstan Premier League players
Israeli Premier League players
Liga Leumit players
Expatriate footballers from Georgia (country)
Expatriate footballers in Bosnia and Herzegovina
Expatriate footballers in Kazakhstan
Expatriate footballers in Israel
Expatriate sportspeople from Georgia (country) in Bosnia and Herzegovina
Expatriate sportspeople from Georgia (country) in Kazakhstan
Expatriate sportspeople from Georgia (country) in Israel